American International School of Lagos (AISL) is an American international school in Lagos, Nigeria serving preschool to grade 12.

The school was founded in 1964.

Student body
AISL's wide diversity in its student population consists of 600+ students of whom approximately 30% are Americans. Students from India, United Kingdom, Nigeria, Canada, South Africa, Israel, Lebanon, and the Netherlands all make up significant portions of our population while the balance consists of students from over 50 countries, reflecting the international character of the school.

Notable alumni 

 Michael Boulos, Nigerian-American business executive and partner of Tiffany Trump

References

External links

 American International School of Lagos
 AISL Official Facebook Page

International schools in Lagos
Lagos
1964 establishments in Nigeria
Educational institutions established in 1964